Ureinung is a 2013 Indian Meitei language film directed by Pilu Heigrujam and produced by Bandana Maisnam and Ilu, under the banner of Bandana films. It stars Sonia Samjetsabam as the titular protagonist with Leishangthem Rahul in the lead roles. The film was released at Bhagyachandra Open Air Theatre (BOAT) in 2013.

Ureinung is based on the music video of the same title, which stars Nirmal Kangjam and Sonia Samjetsabam. In the film, Nirmal Kangjam is replaced by Leishangthem Rahul and Sonia Hijam by Chitra Pangabam.

Cast
 Leishangthem Rahul
 Sonia Samjetsabam as Ureinung
 Heisnam Ongbi Indu
 Denny Likmabam
 Chitra Pangabam
 Bebeto
 Samjetsabam Mangoljao
 Dev
 Bidyalaxmi
 Mango
 Raj Elangbam

Soundtrack
G. Hemchandra and A.R. Inao composed the soundtrack for the film and Mantri Meitei wrote the lyrics. The songs are titled Nungsi Nangbu Ureinung and Konggoi Khuroure Lakaanung.

Reception 
Writing about Sonia Samjetsabam for Hueiyen Lanpao, Meira and Soibam opined that "Sonia Samjetsabam has made a mark in Manipuri film world with a lead role in the film "Ureinung'".

References

External links
 
 
 

2010s Meitei-language films
2013 films
Meitei folklore in popular culture